Chotyně is a municipality and village in Liberec District in the Liberec Region of the Czech Republic. It has about 1,000 inhabitants.

Administrative parts
The village of Grabštejn is an administrative part of Chotyně.

History
The first written mention of Chotyně dates from 1381.

References

External links

Villages in Liberec District